Dixon's Ferry was the former name for Dixon, Illinois, United States. It was located on the bank of the Rock River near present-day Illinois Route 26. John Dixon operated a rope ferry service to transport mail from Peoria to Galena, and he also established the first post office. The surrounding settlement was known as Dixon's Ferry.

There was a fort named Fort Dixon by the town which served as the town's protection during the Black Hawk War.

References 

Dixon, Illinois